The Baldwin DRS-6-4-1500 was a diesel-electric locomotive that was produced by Baldwin Locomotive Works between 1946 and 1952. DRS-6-4-1500, one of Baldwin’s heavy road-switchers, was rated at 1,500 horsepower and powered with a 608SC engine and rode on two three-axle trucks with an A1A-A1A wheel arrangement. As was the case with nearly all of Baldwin's diesel designs, Westinghouse supplied the company with all of the DRS-6-4-1500’s needed internal components such as traction motors, generators, and air equipment.

Overall, 91 units were sold in the United States and three North African countries over the course of six years. 29 units were sold domestically to seven railroads between 1946 and 1948, but the model did far better in the export market with 62 units purchased for Algerian, Moroccan, and Tunisian railways between 1946 and 1952. The model designed for foreign sale in Africa was listed as the DRS-6-4-1500E and was essentially the same as its domestic counterpart except for a different end cab setup. The DRS-6-4-1500 was replaced in Baldwin's catalog by the AS-416 in 1950, but it continued to be produced for export orders until 1952.

Original buyers

References
Brown, John. (2001). The Baldwin Locomotive Works, 1831-1915: A Study in American Industrial Practice. Studies in Industry and Society Series. Baltimore, MD: Johns Hopkins University Press. .
Dolzall, Gary W.; Dolzall, Stephen F. (1984). Diesels from Eddystone: The Story of Baldwin Diesel Locomotives. Milwaukee, WI: Kalmbach Publishing. .
Kirkland, John F. (1994). The Diesel Builders volume 3: Baldwin Locomotive Works. Interurbans Special No. 116. Glendale, CA: Interurban Press. .
Marre, Louis A. (1995). Diesel Locomotives: The First 50 Years: A Guide to Diesels Built Before 1972. Railroad Reference Series. Waukesha, WI: Kalmbach Publishing. .
Solomon, Brian (2010). Baldwin Locomotives. Minneapolis, MN: Voyageur Press. .

A1A-A1A locomotives
DRS-6-4-1500
Diesel-electric locomotives of the United States
Railway locomotives introduced in 1946
Standard gauge locomotives of the United States
Standard gauge locomotives of Algeria
Standard gauge locomotives of Morocco
Standard gauge locomotives of Tunisia
Diesel-electric locomotives of Algeria
Diesel-electric locomotives of Morocco
Diesel-electric locomotives of Tunisia